Marja-Liisa Völlers (born 28 September 1984) is a German teacher and politician of the Social Democratic Party (SPD) who has been serving as a member of the Bundestag from the state of Lower Saxony since 2017.

Political career 
In the 2017 German federal election, Völlers stood in the SPD constituency of Nienburg II – Schaumburg. She lost to CDU candidate Maik Beermann.

Völlers became a member of the Bundestag in 2017 when she succeeded Carola Reimann who had resigned. She is a member of the Committee on Health and the Committee on Education, Research and Technology Assessment, where she serves as her parliamentary group's rapporteur on digitization and inclusion. Following the 2021 elections, she also joined the Defence Committee and the Parliamentary Oversight Panel (PKGr), which provides parliamentary oversight of Germany’s intelligence services BND, BfV and MAD.

In addition to her committee assignments, Völlers has been a member of the German delegation to the NATO Parliamentary Assembly since 2022, where she is part of the Defence and Security Committee.

Within her parliamentary group, Völlers has been serving as one of the two speakers of the Seeheim Circle (alongside Dirk Wiese) since 2022.

Other activities 
 Education and Science Workers' Union (GEW), Member

References

External links 

  
 Bundestag biography 

1984 births
Living people
Members of the Bundestag for Lower Saxony
Female members of the Bundestag
21st-century German women politicians
Members of the Bundestag 2017–2021
Members of the Bundestag 2021–2025
Members of the Bundestag for the Social Democratic Party of Germany